The FIS Team Tour 2013 was the fifth edition of FIS Team Tour which took place in Willingen, Klingenthal and Oberstdorf organized between 9–17 February 2013.

Calendar

Overall

References

External links 
  

FIS Team Tour
2013 in ski jumping
2013 in German sport
February 2013 sports events in Europe